The  William Walter Mason Memorial Bridge (also known as  Barron River Bridge) is a road bridge that carries the Captain Cook Highway across the Barron River at the boundary of four suburbs in Cairns (Stratford, Aeroglen, Barron, and Machans Beach) in the Cairns Region, Queensland, Australia.

The first Barron River Bridge was built by John Holland Constructions in 1977. On 12 August 1978 it was named after William Walter Mason, the first settler who bought land on the north side of the Barron River in 1882.

The first bridge was converted to southbound traffic after the second northbound bridge was built in 1988 as part of the highway duplication project. Both bridges are known as the William Walter Mason Bridges.

References

External links

 Bridge on Stratford History webpage

1977 establishments in Australia
Buildings and structures in Cairns
Road bridges in Queensland
Bridges completed in 1977
Bridges completed in 1988
Beam bridges
Concrete bridges in Australia